Marietta Peabody Tree (April 17, 1917 – August 15, 1991) was an American socialite and political reporter, who represented the United States on the United Nations Commission on Human Rights, appointed under the administration of John F. Kennedy.

Early life
Marietta Endicott Peabody was the only daughter of Malcolm Endicott Peabody, the rector of Grace Episcopal Church in Lawrence, Massachusetts, and Mary Elizabeth Parkman. Her grandfather Rev. Endicott Peabody was founder and first headmaster of Groton School where her four brothers Endicott, Samuel, George, and Malcolm were educated.

Tree's mother Mary was a dedicated charity volunteer, and encouraged her daughter to get involved with the community.

Tree attended St. Timothy's School, where she excelled in athletics above studies. An effervescent, leggy blonde, she was recognized as an accomplished flirt from an early age. She undertook a grand tour of Europe and finishing school in Florence upon graduation to avoid college.  When asked to predict her own future, she wrote down: "Parties, people, and politics."

Her father insisted that she attend college, and she enrolled at the University of Pennsylvania in 1936. Although she withdrew from the Class of 1940, in later interviews she would exclaim: "I'll never stop being grateful to my father for forcing me to go to college. It changed my life." In 1964 she was presented with an honorary Doctor of Laws degree, and in 1971 with an honorary Bachelor of Arts. She is also an honorary member of Alpha Kappa Alpha sorority.

Desmond FitzGerald
During college, Marietta was courted by New York City lawyer 
Desmond FitzGerald. The couple married on September 2, 1939. A year later, Marietta gave birth to a daughter Frances FitzGerald, who became a noted journalist and historian.

Her ardent liberal Democratic views clashed with those of her Republican husband and apparently created tensions in the marriage. After America entered the Second World War in December 1941, Marietta accepted a post as part of the American delegation assisting the British Ministry of Information.

During the war years, Marietta became romantically involved with the film director John Huston.

Ronald Tree
While involved with Huston and married to FitzGerald, Marietta began an affair with Ronald Tree, who was a grandson of retail magnate Marshall Field and MP for Harborough, Leicestershire.

Tree and Peabody divorced their spouses at the end of World War II and married on July 26, 1947. Marietta moved into Tree's home, Ditchley Park, but found herself bored with English country life. Tree and most of his friends were Conservatives, and Democrat Marietta again found herself politically isolated. Their daughter Penelope was born in 1949.

Short of money, Tree sold Ditchley and agreed to return to New York City with Marietta, her daughter Frances Fitzgerald and their own daughter, future '60s fashion model Penelope Tree, and his butler Collins.

Politics and Adlai Stevenson
Marietta Tree immediately joined the Lexington Democratic Club, and two years later was elected the county chairwoman. She was elected to the Democratic State Committee in 1954.

Tree began an affair with Adlai Stevenson in 1952, the year of his first unsuccessful presidential campaign. Perhaps related to his bisexuality, Tree’s husband was unfazed by the affair and even invited Stevenson to the couple's homes in New York, Barbados and London.

They continued their affair through his unsuccessful 1956 presidential campaign. Afterward, however, Stevenson began to take other lovers.

Tree also retained a connection to Huston, who gave her a role in his 1960 movie The Misfits.

At the same time, John F. Kennedy named her the United States Representative to the United Nations Commission on Human Rights, where she was able to work directly under Stevenson, who had been named head of the American delegation.  She served in this position from 1961 to 1964.

On July 14, 1965, Tree and Stevenson were walking in London when he suffered a heart attack, and later died at St George's Hospital. That night in her diary, she wrote: "Adlai is dead. We were together."

Later life
She and her husband remained married, though estranged. Ronald Tree died of a stroke on July 14, 1976, in London, while Marietta was in New York.

Her affair with English architect Richard Llewelyn-Davies ended with his sudden death in 1981.

Tree supported herself in later years by getting herself appointed to some well paid directorships, including the boards of CBS, Pan Am, and Lend Lease Corporation of Australia. She also served as women's trustee on the board of the University of Pennsylvania.

In 1987 she appeared in the Danny Huston film Mr. North, released about a month before John Huston died of emphysema on August 28, 1987.

Death
Tree died of breast cancer on August 15, 1991, at her home in New York.

Character
Isaiah Berlin characterized her political standing as "a progressive, liberal figure who was mixed up with a lot of naive left-wing sympathizers." As the feminist movement gained momentum in the 1960s, Marietta refused to support its cause, and in 1967 she refused to sign three resolutions pertaining to women's rights.

Filmography

References
Seebohm, Caroline - No Regrets: The Life of Marietta Tree. Pub: Simon & Schuster, 1998

References

External links

Marietta Tree Papers at the Schlesinger Library, Radcliffe Institute, Harvard University.

1917 births
1991 deaths
American expatriates in the United Kingdom
American people of English descent
American socialites
Deaths from cancer in New York (state)
Deaths from breast cancer
New York (state) Democrats
Peabody family
People from Lawrence, Massachusetts
Representatives of the United States to the United Nations Human Rights Council
Time (magazine) people
American women ambassadors
20th-century American Episcopalians
20th-century American women